Minuscule 550 (in the Gregory-Aland numbering), 537 (Scrivener's numbering), ε 250 (in the Soden numbering), is a Greek minuscule manuscript of the New Testament, on parchment. Palaeographically it has been assigned to the 12th century.
The manuscript has complex contents, with marginalia. It was adapted for liturgical use.

Description 

The codex contains a complete text of the four Gospels on 211 parchment leaves (size ). The writing is in one column per page, 33 lines per page, in large and spread minuscule letters.

There is also a division according to the Ammonian Sections (in Mark 240 sections, the last in 16:9), (no references to the Eusebian Canons).

Text 

The Greek text of the codex is a representative of the Byzantine text-type. Hermann von Soden included it to the textual family Kx. Aland placed it in Category V.
According to the Claremont Profile Method it represents Kx in Luke 1 and Luke 20. In Luke 10 no profile was made.

History 

In 1609 the manuscript belonged to Gerasimus. It was held in the Karakalou monastery at Athos peninsula. In 1837 Robert Curzon, Lord Zouche, brought this manuscript to England (along with the codices 547-551). The entire collection of Curzon was bequeathed by his daughter in 1917 to the British Museum, where it had been deposited, by his son, since 1876.

The manuscript was added to the list of the New Testament manuscript by F. H. A. Scrivener (536) and C. R. Gregory (549). It was examined by Scrivener, Dean Burgon, and Gregory.

It is currently housed at the British Library (Add MS 39593) in London.

See also 

 List of New Testament minuscules
 Biblical manuscript
 Textual criticism

References

Further reading 
 S. Emmel, Catalogue of Materials for Writing, Early Writings on Tablets and Stones, rolled and other Manuscripts and Oriental Manuscript Books, in the Library of the Honourable Robert Curzon (London 1849).

External links 

Greek New Testament minuscules
12th-century biblical manuscripts
British Library additional manuscripts